A CBD cigarette is a cigarette made with hemp instead of purely tobacco, containing cannabidiol (CBD) but a negligible amount of psychoactive tetrahydrocannabinol (THC).  typically last between 2–3 hours and can take anywhere from seconds to several minutes to set in, making it one of the fastest methods to feel the effects of cannabidiol.

, CBD cigarettes will be at the Swiss supermarket chain Coop. Swiss law allows the sale of products containing less than 1% THC, contrasted with laws elsewhere in Europe limiting THC to 0.2%.

US law and regulation following the 2018 Farm Bill allows the sale of hemp products containing less than 0.3% THC on a dry weight, post-decarboxylation basis. Many vendors are positioning CBD cigarettes as an alternative to tobacco cigarettes, which contain physically addictive nicotine. Most, or nearly all, CBD cigarettes do not contain tobacco—instead they are usually made with CBD hemp flowers which possess low amounts of the main psychoactive part of cannabis, tetrahydrocannabinol, commonly known as THC.

References

Cannabis in Switzerland
Cigarettes
Preparations of cannabis